George Rogers may refer to:

Politics
George Rogers (Alberta politician) (born 1958), former mayor of Leduc, Alberta, MLA for the riding of Leduc-Beaumont-Devon
George Rogers (British politician) (1906–1983), British member of Parliament
George Rogers (Manitoba politician) (1856–1901), politician in Manitoba, Canada
George Rogers (Massachusetts politician) (1933-2018), Massachusetts General Court
George F. Rogers (1887–1948), American congressman from New York
George W. Rogers Jr. (1927–2017), American politician

Sports
George Rogers (American football) (born 1958), American football player
George Rogers (cricketer, born 1815) (1815–1870), English cricketer
George Rogers (cricketer, born 1905) (1905–1958), English cricketer
George Rogers (Surrey cricketer) (1847–1905), English cricketer
George C. Rogers (1889–1964), American college sports coach

Other
George Herbert Rogers (1820–1872), Australian stage actor
George Bigelow Rogers (1869–1945), American architect
George B. Rogers, president of German Wallace College
, writer of 1936 book Studies in Paul's Epistle to the Romans, using the Concordant Version

See also
George Rodgers (disambiguation)
George Rodger (1908–1995), British photojournalist noted for his work in Africa
George Rogers Clark (1752–1818), soldier from Virginia